The 2019 Wimbledon Championships Men's Singles final was the championship tennis match of the men's singles tournament at the 2019 Wimbledon Championships. After 4 hours and 57 minutes, first seed Novak Djokovic defeated second seed Roger Federer in five sets to win the title in a repeat of the 2014 and the 2015 Wimbledon finals. It was the longest Wimbledon final in history, and the last major final of Federer's career.

Overview
Novak Djokovic was the defending champion and successfully defended his title, defeating Roger Federer in 4 hours and 57 minutes, 7–6(5), 1–6, 7–6(4), 4–6, 13–12(3), the longest singles final in Wimbledon history and the third longest Grand Slam final in history behind the 2012 Australian Open final (which Djokovic also won) and the 2022 Australian Open final.

Djokovic became the first man since Bob Falkenburg in the 1948 Wimbledon Championships to win the title after being championship points down, having saved two when down 7−8 in the fifth set. Djokovic also became the first man since Gastón Gaudio at the 2004 French Open to save championship points in order to win a Grand Slam title, and the first time that any singles player, male or female, has saved a championship point to win a Grand Slam title since 2005 Wimbledon. Djokovic became the second man and third singles player overall to win multiple Grand Slam titles after saving match point during the tournament, after Rod Laver and Serena Williams; his previous time doing it was also against Federer, that being in the 2011 US Open semi-finals, after which he defeated Rafael Nadal in the final.

The match is also notable for the fact that Federer lost despite statistically outplaying Djokovic in almost every category (see table below): having a better first- and second-serve percentage, more aces, fewer double-faults, more winners, more breaks of serve and a more efficient break-point conversion rate, more points won when returning serve and at a higher efficiency, and won a higher total number of points and service games. Besides the final scoreline, the only statistical categories Djokovic won were having fewer unforced errors and all the tiebreaks that occurred.

This was the first Wimbledon where a final set tie break rule was introduced. Upon reaching 12–all in the fifth set, a classic tie break would be played. The men's singles final was the first final, as well as the first singles match, in which the new rule came into effect, with Djokovic winning the tiebreak 7−3. This match was named the greatest men's tennis match of the 2010s by Tennis Magazine. A 2022 rule change meant that all tennis matches that are tied at six-all in the deciding set, even the Olympics, are decided by a first-to-ten-point format. Should the tiebreaker game be tied at 9-all, whoever scores two straight points wins.

Officials
The Chair Umpire was Damian Steiner of Argentina.

Statistics

Source:

See also
2019 Wimbledon Championships
2019 Wimbledon Championships – Men's singles
Djokovic–Federer rivalry

References

External links
Match details at the official ATP site
Player head-to-head at the official ATP site
Match Report, official Wimbledon website
Match Statistics, official Wimbledon website
Full match on YouTube
Extended highlights on YouTube

Men's Singles Final
2019
Novak Djokovic tennis matches
Roger Federer tennis matches